A biography is a genre of media based on the written accounts of individual lives.

Biography or biographic may also refer to:

Music
Biography (Lisa Stansfield album), a greatest hits collection from Lisa Stansfield
Biography (Horslips album)
A Biography, a John Mellencamp album

Other uses
Biography (TV program), a popular biographical sketch series on the A&E television network
The Biography Channel, a television network owned by A&E and inspired by the above program
Biography magazine, a monthly magazine that was part of the Biography franchise expansion
Biography (journal), an interdisciplinary quarterly
Biography (play), a 1932 play by S.N. Behrman
Biographic (comics), started in 2005